Palo is a city in Linn County, Iowa, United States. The population was 1,407 at the time of the 2020 census. It is part of the Cedar Rapids Metropolitan Statistical Area.

Palo is located near Pleasant Creek State Recreation Park.

History
In 1849 a regional post office was named by Marion resident Dr. Bardwell, shortly after the Battle of Palo Alto in the Mexican-American War. Dr. Bardwell, used the short name Palo. The town was surveyed in 1854 and the first building in Palo was built in the same year and the town took its name from the local post office.

Floods of 2008 
Palo suffered severe damage during the 2008 flood. Approximately 980 residents, the entirety of the town, were ordered to abandon their homes and businesses. The mandatory evacuation was ordered by the Linn County Emergency Management department, due to flooding from the Cedar River.

Geography
Palo is located at  (42.062201, -91.793126).

Demographics

2010 census
As of the census of 2010, there were 1,026 people, 358 households, and 292 families living in the city. The racial makeup of the city was 97.6% White, 0.5% African American, 0.1% Native American, 0.3% Asian, and 1.6% from two or more races. Hispanic or Latino of any race were 1.4% of the population.

There were 358 households, of which 48.6% had children under the age of 18 living with them, 69.6% were married couples living together, 6.4% had a female householder with no husband present, 5.6% had a male householder with no wife present, and 18.4% were non-families. 13.7% of all households were made up of individuals, and 4.2% had someone living alone who was 65 years of age or older. The average household size was 2.87 and the average family size was 3.13.

The median age in the city was 32.4 years. 32.3% of residents were under the age of 18; 4.7% were between the ages of 18 and 24; 34% were from 25 to 44; 22.1% were from 45 to 64; and 6.8% were 65 years of age or older. The gender makeup of the city was 51.6% male and 48.4% female.

2000 census
As of the census of 2000, there were 614 people, 247 households, and 170 families living in the city. The racial makeup of the city was 98.70% White, 0.16% African American, 0.16% Asian, 0.16% from other races, and 0.81% from two or more races. Hispanic or Latino of any race were 0.65% of the population.

There were 247 households, out of which 28.3% had children under the age of 18 living with them, 61.5% were married couples living together, 4.0% had a female householder with no husband present, and 30.8% were non-families. 23.1% of all households were made up of individuals, and 8.9% had someone living alone who was 65 years of age or older. The average household size was 2.49 and the average family size was 2.94.

In the city, the population was spread out, with 25.1% under the age of 18, 5.7% from 18 to 24, 31.6% from 25 to 44, 28.3% from 45 to 64, and 9.3% who were 65 years of age or older. The median age was 38 years. For every 100 females, there were 96.2 males. For every 100 females age 18 and over, there were 99.1 males.

The median income for a household in the city was $53,558, and the median income for a family was $58,571. Males had a median income of $39,167 versus $24,044 for females. The per capita income for the city was $21,429. About 1.1% of families and 4.6% of the population were below the poverty line, including none of those under age 18 and 18.6% of those age 65 or over.

Education
Palo is in the Cedar Rapids Community School District.

Zoned schools for Palo:
 Elementary schools: Viola Gibson
 Secondary schools: Harding Middle School and Kennedy High School

References

External links 
 City Data Statistical Data and more about Palo, Iowa
 Palo Iowa  Official City Website

Cities in Linn County, Iowa
Cities in Iowa
Cedar Rapids, Iowa metropolitan area
1854 establishments in Iowa
Populated places established in 1854